Jerome T. Tao (born 1966) is a Judge of the Nevada Court of Appeals.

Education and career
Tao received his undergraduate degree from Cornell University and his J.D. from George Washington University Law School in 1992. After law school, Tau served as a Clark County Deputy District Attorney, Chief Deputy Public Defender, and as a civil attorney in private practice. From 1999 to 2001, Tao worked as a Senior Advisor to Democratic U.S. Senator Harry Reid.  In January 2011, Tao was appointed by Nevada Governor Brian Sandoval to the Eighth Judicial District Court. In December 2014, he was appointed to the newly created Court of Appeals.

Positions
During his supreme court campaign, Tao described himself as a "textualist," and was endorsed by the National Rifle Association.

Elections
In 2018, Tao lost to Elissa Cadish in the general election for Seat C on the Nevada Supreme Court.
In 2016, Tao was unopposed for re-election to the Nevada Court of Appeals.
In 2014, Tao defeated Nicholas Anthony Perrino for re-election to the Eighth Judicial District Court, receiving 67.4 percent of the vote.
In 2012, Tao defeated Chris T. Rasmussen for re-election to the Eighth Judicial District Court, receiving 51.02 percent of the vote.

Reference section

External links section
Judge Tau

21st-century American judges
Nevada lawyers
Nevada state court judges
Cornell University alumni
Living people
1966 births